Shuixi station, is a station of  Line 21 of the Guangzhou Metro. It started operations on 20 December 2019. It will become an interchange station with Line 7 when it opens in 2023.

The station has an underground island platform. Platform 1 is for trains heading to Zengcheng Square, whilst platform 2 is for trains heading to Yuancun, along with 2 unused bypass tracks next to the stopping tracks.

Exits
There are 2 exits, lettered A and B. Both exits are accessible and are located on Shuixi Road. Exit A provides interchange with the Huangpu Tram Line 1.

Gallery

References

Railway stations in China opened in 2019
Guangzhou Metro stations in Huangpu District